Patrick Bellegarde-Smith is a professor emeritus of Africology at the University of Wisconsin–Milwaukee. Bellegarde-Smith is an associate editor of the Journal of Haitian Studies and former president of the Haitian Studies Association and the Congress of Santa Barbara (KOSANBA), a scholarly association for the study of Vodou and other African-derived religions.

Education
He earned his PhD in international relations from American University and he holds degrees in comparative politics and history.

Family
Bellegarde-Smith is the grandson of the Haitian diplomat Dantès Bellegarde.  Bellegarde-Smith is an houngan, or Vodou priest.

Books
 In the Shadow of Powers: Dantès Bellegarde in Haitian Social Thought (1985)
 Haiti: The Breached Citadel (1990) (Second Edition 2004)
 Fragments of Bone: Neo-African Religions in a New World (Editor) (2005)
 Haitian Vodou: Spirit, Myth, and Reality (Co-editor with Claudine Michel) (2006)
 Invisible Powers: Vodou and Development in Haiti (Co-editor with Claudine Michel) (2006)

References

External links
UW–Milwaukee Africology Faculty of Patrick Bellegarde-Smith
Patrick Bellegarde-Smith - Haitian-American leader - Interview
UWM professor holds hope for rebuilding Haiti

Living people
Historians of Haiti
Haitian male writers
University of Wisconsin–Milwaukee faculty
Writers from Wisconsin
Year of birth missing (living people)
21st-century American historians